Essex is an Anglo-Saxon locational surname, for someone from Essex, England. Notable people with the surname include:

 David Essex (born 1947), English actor, singer-songwriter, and musician
Frankie Essex, TV personality on reality show The Only Way is Essex
Joey Essex, TV personality on reality show The Only Way is Essex
 Karen Essex, American novelist, screenwriter, and journalist
 Mark Essex (1949–1973), American spree killer
 Trai Essex (born 1982), American professional football player
 ](Darren Essex)] (born 1968),
Fitness Model and Poet.
Mrs Rock (died after 1779), English actor also known as Miss Essex
Nadia Essex (born 1981/2), TV personality

Fictional characters:
 Nathaniel Essex, the true identity of Mister Sinister, a Marvel comics supervillain

References

English toponymic surnames